Bryan Ottenhoff (born 8 July 1991) is a Dutch professional footballer who plays as a centre back for OFC Oostzaan in the Dutch Derde Divisie. He formerly played for Almere City and Oțelul Galați.

References

External links
 Voetbal International profile 
 

1991 births
Living people
Footballers from Amsterdam
Dutch footballers
Almere City FC players
ASC Oțelul Galați players
SC Telstar players
Eerste Divisie players
Liga I players
Expatriate footballers in Romania
Association football defenders
Dutch expatriate footballers
Dutch expatriate sportspeople in Romania
OFC Oostzaan players